The Romanian Court of Accounts is the Romanian state authority charged with conducting financial audit over the way the state and public resources are managed and used.

History

The court was established by a law of 1864, signed by Alexandru Ioan Cuza. In December 1948, under the nascent communist regime, it was disbanded. Revived in 1973 as the Higher Court of Financial Control (Curtea Superioară de Control Financiar), this too was abolished in early 1990, following the Romanian Revolution. The Court of Audit was re-established by a law of 1992, and began functioning the following year.

Presidents

See also
European Court of Auditors

Notes

External links
Official website

Government of Romania
Romania
1864 establishments in Romania
Supreme audit institutions